Watoga State Park is a state park located near Seebert in Pocahontas County, West Virginia. Nearby parks include the Greenbrier River Trail, which is adjacent to the park, Beartown State Park, and Droop Mountain Battlefield State Park. Also immediately adjacent to the park is the 9,482-acre Calvin Price State Forest. It is one of the darkest night skies of all of West Virginia State Parks.

History
Watoga State Park’s name comes from the Cherokee word for “starry waters.”  The land that forms the nucleus of Watoga was originally acquired in January 1925, when the park was initially planned to be a state forest.  In May 1934, a decision was made to instead develop the site as a state park.  Much of the development on the site was done by the Civilian Conservation Corps (CCC) and the park was first opened on July 1, 1937. Development of the park stopped during WWII, but after the war, work on the park resumed, and the first camping area opened in 1953, and eight deluxe cabins opened in 1956. Recreational use of the park increased during the 60s and 70s, requiring the addition of another camping area. Today, the park is supported by the Watoga State Park Foundation which promotes the recreation, conservation, ecology, history, and natural resources of the park.

New Deal Resources in Watoga State Park Historic District
The New Deal Resources in Watoga State Park Historic District is a national historic district encompassing 59 contributing buildings, 35 contributing structures, 2 contributing sites, and 11 contributing objects.  They include water fountains; trails; a swimming pool; a reservoir; rental cabins; and picnic shelters; as well as a former CCC camp. The park is the site of the Fred E. Brooks Memorial Arboretum, a 400-acre arboretum that encompasses the drainage of Two Mile Run. Named in honor of Fred E. Brooks, a noted West Virginia naturalist who died in 1933, the Arboretum's construction began about 1935 and a dedication was held in 1938.

It was listed on the National Register of Historic Places in 2010.

Features

 34 cabins
 2 campgrounds with 88 total campsites (50 with electricity)
 Swimming pool
  fishing lake with boat rentals
 37.5 miles of hiking trails
 Brooks Memorial Arboretum
 Ann Bailey Lookout Tower
 Greenbrier River Trail
 CCC Museum
 Picnic areas

Hiking Trails 
Watoga State Park has many hiking trails to choose from that vary wildly in length and difficulty.  There is a wide variety of trail choices, so any level hiker will enjoy their time on the Watoga State Park trails.

A small list of these trails includes

 Allegheny Trail 
 Ann Bailey Trail 
 Arrowhead Trail 
 Bearpen Trail 
 Brooks Memorial Arboretum Trails 
 Buck and Doe Trail 
 Burnside Ridge Trail 
 Honeymoon Trail 
 Jesse's Cove Trail 
 Kennison Run Trail 
 Lake Trail 
 Monongaseneka Trail 
 North Boundary Trail 
 Pine Run Trail 
 T. M. Cheek Trail 
 Ten Acre Trail 
 South Burnside Trail

These trails are regularly maintained by the Watoga Foundation, and you can look at a map by clicking here.

See also

List of West Virginia state parks
State park

References

External links

West Virginia CCC information
An entry by the International Dark-Sky Association

National Register of Historic Places in Pocahontas County, West Virginia
Historic districts in Pocahontas County, West Virginia
History of West Virginia
State parks of West Virginia
Protected areas of Pocahontas County, West Virginia
IUCN Category V
Protected areas established in 1934
Civilian Conservation Corps in West Virginia
Campgrounds in West Virginia
Parks on the National Register of Historic Places in West Virginia
Dark-sky preserves in the United States